Arne Agnar Jensen (15 November 1954 – 29 December 2020) was a Norwegian media and corporate executive.

Born in Bergen, he had a siv.øk. degree, and worked in the advertisement industry during the 1980s. From 1989 to 1993, he was the chief executive of BSB Bates Group. He then became chief executive of TV 2, and then chief executive of the airline Braathens from 1999 until it was taken over by Scandinavian Airlines System in 2001. He then became chief executive of Merkantildata, later Ementor, from 2001 to 2004. He died in December 2020.

References

1954 births
2020 deaths
Norwegian marketing people
TV 2 (Norway) people
Norwegian television executives
Braathens people
Norwegian airline chief executives